The Turpan–Hotan Expressway, commonly referred to as the Tuhe Expressway, is a Chinese expressway that connects the G30 Lianyungang–Khorgas Expressway at Xiaocaohu, in Toksun County, Turpan, with China National Highway 315 in Lop County, Hotan Prefecture. The expressway, designated G3012, is a spur of the  G30 Lianyungang–Khorgas Expressway and is completely in Xinjiang.

The expressway is fully complete from its northern terminus in Toksun to Yecheng and from Karakax County to its southern terminus in Lop County, Hotan. Only a section from Kargilik to Karakax County remains to be built. Eventually, the southern terminus will connect with the western end of the G0612 Xining–Hotan Expressway, which is currently in planning.

References

Expressways in Xinjiang
Chinese national-level expressways